Between War and Peace: The Potsdam Conference is a  book by Herbert Feis. It won the 1961 Pulitzer Prize for History.

References 

Pulitzer Prize for History-winning works
1960 non-fiction books
American history books
Princeton University Press books